Pseudamnicola exilis is a species of very small freshwater snail with an operculum, an aquatic gastropod mollusc in the family Hydrobiidae.

Geographic distribution 
P. exilis is endemic to Greece.

References

Hydrobiidae
Gastropods of Europe
Endemic fauna of Greece
Taxa named by Georg Ritter von Frauenfeld
Gastropods described in 1863